Everybody Does It is a 1949 comedy film starring Paul Douglas, Linda Darnell and Celeste Holm.
In the film, a businessman's wife tries to become an opera star, failing miserably due to her lack of talent. When it turns out that her totally untrained husband is found to have a marvelous singing voice and goes on tour under an assumed name, his wife is livid.

Darnell sings long stretches of an imaginary opera, L'Amore di Fatima. The music for it was written by Mario Castelnuovo-Tedesco. In a little tongue-in-cheek detail, the poster for the opera lists Tedesco – who wrote real operas — as the composer. To add to the illusion of the opera's authenticity,  Douglas also sings some known songs, including a musical setting of the Rudyard Kipling poem Mandalay and the Toreador Song from Carmen. The operatic scenes were staged by Vladimir Rosing.

The film is a word-for-word remake of 1939's Wife, Husband and Friend, which starred Warner Baxter as Borland, Loretta Young as his wife, and Binnie Barnes as Cecil Carver.

Plot
Leonard Borland (Paul Douglas) lives and works in New York City as a wrecking contractor, married to socialite Doris (Celeste Holm). Even though – according to her husband – she has no singing talent, Doris considers herself an aspiring opera singer and regularly pressures Leonard to accompany her to operas. Already dismayed by his father-in-law Major Blair's (Charles Coburn) insistence that Doris take some singing lessons, Leonard becomes further estranged from Doris when her career takes off. Despite financing her recital and arranging an important critic to watch her performance, Doris shows no gratitude.

Meanwhile, successful opera singer Cecil Carver (Linda Darnell) is complaining about being unable to locate a suitable baritone for her new production, when she and the critic are suddenly rushed to Doris's opera performance. Cecil is not altogether impressed with the newcomer's talent and invites Leonard to her apartment to share her opinion. The two quickly hit it off and share a passionate kiss. Then, she finds out that Leonard, unlike his wife, has a powerful voice, and immediately assigns him to her production under the name "Logan Bennett". Doris is too busy training with her mother (Lucile Watson) and vocal coach to note what her husband is up to, and believes that he is on the road for his wrecking work.

While on tour, Cecil attempts to seduce him, but Leonard, still much in love with Doris, rejects her. Back in New York, Leonard learns that Doris is now under medical care for shock treatment, caused by a disastrous booking at a movie palace. Even though she decides to give up her musical aspirations, she agrees to guest a cocktail party for celebrities. Noticing Leonard's uncomfortable reaction to Cecil's presence at the party, Doris realizes that she might be her husband's mistress. Cecil is disappointed that Leonard pretends not to know her and assures Doris that she is not attracted to him whatsoever, and only knows him through the opera. The audience, dumbfounded by the revelation that Leonard is an opera singer, demands that he perform at the party.

Humiliated by his betrayal, Doris orders Leonard to leave her. A few days later, Leonard resides penniless in a hotel and finds out that Doris currently lives in Palm Beach. Due to financial troubles, Leonard accepts a steady opera job. At his debut, attended by Doris and her parents, he is surprised by sudden stage fright. An irritated Cecil and her assistant give him some pills and a potion, causing him to feel sick, and fall from the stage before the entire audience. Much to the audience's amusement, he misses his cue and screws up the entire production. He ends his embarrassing performance by falling into the orchestra pit, prompting a livid Cecil to order him to leave. Doris, feeling for her estranged husband, rushes backstage to reconcile with him. Returning home, they find out that Leonard has been offered a lucrative wrecking contract.

Cast
 Paul Douglas as Leonard Borland (aka Logan Bennett)
 Linda Darnell as Cecil Carver
 Celeste Holm as Doris Borland
 Charles Coburn as Major Blair
 Millard Mitchell as Mike Craig
 Lucile Watson as Mrs. Blair
 John Hoyt as Wilkins
 Leon Belasco as Professor Hugo
 George Tobias as Rossi

Music
 Original music by Alfred Newman and Mario Castelnuovo-Tedesco
 Music by Richard A. Whiting and Frank Harling
 Lyrics by Leo Robin
 Songs performed by New York City Opera baritone Stephen Kemalyan, who dubbed for Paul Douglas
 Songs performed by San Francisco Opera soprano Helen Spann, who dubbed for Linda Darnell

Reception
Bosley Crowther, critic for The New York Times, praised Douglas's "robust comedic talent" and wrote that "Mr. Douglas, given his head and a very fat part on which to use it, turns in a highly funny job." He also commended the rest of the cast of the "glib and gleesome farce."

References

External links
 
 
 
 Everybody Does It at Movie Dubbers
 

1949 films
1949 comedy films
American black-and-white films
American comedy films
Films about opera
Films based on works by James M. Cain
Films directed by Edmund Goulding
Films set in New York City
Films with screenplays by Nunnally Johnson
20th Century Fox films
1940s American films